Baray is an administrative ward in the Karatu district of the Arusha Region of Tanzania. The ward is home to the Hadza. According to the 2012 census, the ward has a total population of 23,554.

References

Karatu District
Wards of Arusha Region